Belgium B was a secondary football team that occasionally served as support for the Belgium national football team. At times they have played against the full national team of Luxembourg; they have also played matches against 'B' or U-23 teams from other football associations. Since the team's first use in 1924, there have been at minimum 104 games; most of them against Luxembourg, but also against English, French, Italian, Norwegian, Portuguese, and Swiss teams. The last recorded match dates from February 2000 (a 1–1 draw against France B).

This team is assumed to have been always different from the Belgian U-21 team. However, it is not well documented whether this is the same Belgian team that played qualifiers for the Summer Olympics until 1988; neither is it clear whether age restrictions (e.g. under-25) have ever been applied.

Match record

Note: this record may not be exhaustive.

Notes

References

B-team
European national B association football teams